The Bloodsucker Leads the Dance is a 1975 Italian film directed by Alfredo Rizzo.

Plot 
In Ireland in 1902, Count Marnak invites a troupe of actors to perform at his island castle. He is stunned by how much Evelyn, the lead actress, resembles his dead wife. They begin an affair, but suddenly, the inhabitants of the castle are turning up decapitated one by one. The count fears that an old family curse is responsible for the grisly slayings.

Cast 
 Patrizia De Rossi as Evelyn 
 Giacomo Rossi-Stuart as Count Richard Marnack 
 Femi Benussi as Sybil 
 Krista Nell as Cora 
 Luciano Pigozzi as Gregory
 Barbara Marzano
 Lidia Olizzi
 Suzette Nadalutti
 Mario Derosa
 Marzia Damon

Style
Sometimes described as a giallo, The Bloodsucker Leads the Dance contains mysterious murders, but killing take place offscreen and lacks the gialli stylish depictions of death and lacks the psychedelic colors and weird camera angles and elaborate set pieces, and no black gloved killers. Italian film historian Roberto Curti described the film as a "standard Gothic yarn".

Production

Prior to directing The Bloodsucker Leads the Dance, Alfredo Rizzo's career was as an actor who made his debut in the 1939 film Lo vedi come sei... lo vedi come sei?. This film marked his last feature as a director and his only horror film he directed. The film was shot between November and December 1974. It was shot at Piccolomini Castle in Balsorano, Castle of Monte San Giovanni Campano, Lake Bracciano and Icet De Paolis Studios in Milan.

Actress Krista Nell was originally going to play the lead, but took on a secondary part in the film due to her leukemia. One month after the film's release, Nell died to the disease.

Release
The Bloodsucker Leads the Dance was released theatrically in Italy on 10 May 1975 where it was distributed by P.A.B. Film. The film grossed a total of 73,369,150 Italian lire. The Italian board of censors objected to the erotic content in the film, specifically the lesbian encounter between Rosalind and Penny and a sex scene between Evelyn and the Count. The sex scenes in the film were kept in their entirety in France in 1977 when the film was released as L'insatiable Samantha (La sangsue). This version also had hardcore footage inserted.

The film was released on home video in Italy as Il marchio di Satana.

Critical reception 
From retrospective reviews, AllMovie wrote, "In the hands of a better filmmaker, it might have been an interesting pastiche, or even played as a clever spoof, but Rizzo appears to have made the whole thing up as he went along", calling it "a fairly ordinary giallo thriller". Curti stated the "film's ineptitude is jaw-dropping", noting that the sea shown in the film is Bracciano lake and a storm features stock footage that is black-and-white in a color film. Curti also disliked the ending, declaring it "one of the most unclimatic endings ever seen in a horror movie".

Footnotes

References

 
</ref>

External links

1975 films
Italian horror films
Giallo films
1975 horror films
Gothic horror films
Films set in 1902
Films set in castles
Films set in Ireland
Films scored by Marcello Giombini
1970s Italian films